Rugby Club Armia Tbilisi is a Georgian semi-professional rugby union club from Tbilisi, who plays in the Georgia Championship, the first division of Georgian rugby. The team was Champion in 2011.

Achievements 

Georgia Championship:
Winners (1): 2011
Runner-up (1): 2013
Third Place (2): 1998, 2000
Georgia Cup:
Winners (2): 2011, 2012

Current squad
2019/20

Current Georgia Elite Squad
  Shalva Mamukashvili
  Giorgi Tkhilaishvili
  Beka Bitsadze
  George Shkinin

International honours 
  Shalva Mamukashvili
  Tariel Donadze
  Davit Gurgenadze
  Kakhaber Uchava
  Giorgi Kalmakhelidze
  Lasha Tavartkiladze
  Giorgi Tkhilaishvili
  Beka Bitsadze
  Zviad Maisuradze
  Mamuka Ninidze
  Irakli Chkhikvadze
  Giorgi Jimsheladze
  Giorgi Elizbarashvili
  George Shkinin

See also
 Rugby union in Georgia

Army
Sport in Tbilisi